Gunsmoke Ranch is a 1937 American Western "Three Mesquiteers" B-movie directed by Joseph Kane.

Cast
Robert Livingston as Stony Brooke
Ray "Crash" Corrigan as Tucson Smith
Max Terhune as Lullaby Joslin
Kenneth Harlan as Phineas T. Flagg
Jean Carmen as Marion Warren
Sammy McKim as Jimmy Warren
Ed 'Oscar' Platt as Oscar (as Oscar)
Lou Fulton as Elmer Twiddlebaum
Burr Caruth as Judge Jonathan Warren
Allen Connor as Henchman Reggie Allen
Yakima Canutt as Henchman Spider
Horace B. Carpenter as Joe Larkin
Jane Keckley as Mathilda Larkin
Robert D. Walker as Seth Williams (as Robert Walker)
Jack Ingram as Cowhand Jed
Jack Kirk as Sheriff
Loren Riebe as Henchman Hank
Vinegar Roan as Henchman Zeke
Wes Warner as Settler
Jack Padjan as Henchman Charles 'Duke' Madden

Soundtrack
Ranchers on the bus - "I Wandered Today to the Hills, Maggie"
Max Terhune - "Oh! Susanna"(Written by Stephen Foster)
Robert Livingston - "When the Campfire is Low on the Prairie" (Written by Oliver Drake)

References

External links

1937 films
American black-and-white films
1937 Western (genre) films
Three Mesquiteers films
Films directed by Joseph Kane
Republic Pictures films
American Western (genre) films
Films produced by Sol C. Siegel
1930s English-language films
1930s American films